Mariáš or Mariasch a three-player, solo trick-taking game of the King–Queen family of Ace-Ten games, but with a simplified scoring system. It is one of the most popular card games in the Czech Republic and Slovakia, but is also played in Bavaria in Germany as well as in Austria. The Hungarian national card game Ulti is an elaboration of Mariáš.

Variants in former Czechoslovakia
 Lízaný mariáš (Draw Mariage) - trick-and-draw game, two players, very similar to old German card game, Mariage and Polish Tysiąc (one thousand)

 Volený mariáš (Called Mariage) - three players, no drawing, eldest hand determines the trump suit, the other players defend together in partnership

 Křížový mariáš (Cross Mariage) - four players, 8 tricks, elder hand sets up the trump suit and calls (chooses) one trump honour card to be in partnership, two others are defenders)
 Licitovaný mariáš (Auction Mariage) - three players, ten tricks bidding phase like in the contract bridge, the strongest player chooses the contract, the other two players become the defenders

 Hvězdicový mariáš (Star Mariage) - five players , six tricks, bidding phase and contractor calls the trump honour, the other three players become the defenders

Basic rules 
 only 32 playing cards: A, 10, K, O, U, 9, 8, 7 in four suits (card 10 is higher than King, except Betl and Durch contracts)
 follow the suit in the trick (like bridge)
 necessity play higher card (override) to kill (take) the trick (unlike bridge)
 if unable to follow suit, necessity play trump card (unlike bridge)
 if unable to kill the trick, smaller card is possible

No shuffling 
The winner of the trick places the cards played to own winning stack on the table (and begin a new trick). Some deals are played only a few tricks and the declarer resigns or shows a winning hand. The score is calculated by adding the counters in all the stacks, but these cards stay in order. The card sequence in the tricks must be conserved. Dealer collect all stacks together without shuffling and offers the opportunity to cut the cards before a new deal. The players can use the information about following "cards in a row" in previous deal, if the cards were shown. This aspect boost the calculations in the next deals, some hands look strong enough, but the reality is different due to odd distribution of honours or suits that are too long or too short in the hands of other players.

Cutting 
Cutting is necessary (note that cutting just one card, or all bar one card, is forbidden) and especially the powerful finesse cause the strong cards can be sent to the cutter´s hand in next deal. Dealer has some possibilities to prevent, he could collect all the stacks in the right way before the cutting. Dealing is ordered by a scheme, after the cutting... alea iacta est)

Dealing 
 7-5-5-5-5-5 in Volený mariáš (the elder hand sets up the trump suit when he has seven cards in hand, after the setting he takes the second part - another five cards, then chooses and puts two cards aside)

 4-4-4-4-4-4-4-4 in Křížový mariáš (elder hand set-up trump when he has four cards in hand)

 5-5-5-2-5-5-5 in Licitovaný mariáš (the winner of bidding process can take two cards left on the table (talon) and put off another two cards and then he pronounces the commitments in his contract).

Scoring 
 Ace = 10 points, 10 = 10 points, last trick (ultimo) = 10 points (summarised 90 points)
 Marriage (K+Q in the same suit in one player´s hand) trump suit 40 points, other suits 20, 20, 20 points (100 bonus points, 190 maximum score)
 draw-game (the same score) is not possible

Special contracts with bonuses 
 Betl (win 0 trick) or Durch (win all tricks) are special plain-trick games incorporated (escape from point-trick game, good chance to win against strong cards)
 7 – play the smallest trump card in the last trick (need to win this trick)
 100 – score 100 points or more (90 points lost the game, need 60+40 with trump marriage or 80+20 with no-trump marriage, each overtrick adds financial bonus)
 2x7 – need win no-trump suit 7 in the penultimate trick, trump 7 after that in the last trick (requirement: two long suits in hand)

"Flek!" (reply by defenders after the contract announcement) doubles the stake. The declarers can reply with "Re", etc.
Hearts set up as trump suit - doubled finance prices too.

Further reading 
 Tomáš Svoboda and coll.: Oficiální pravidla karetních her, Eminent, Prague 2002,

External links 
 
 Czech Mariáš Association - Official website

18th-century card games
Czech card games
Three-player card games
Solo card games
King-Queen games
Point-trick games
German deck card games